Mario Meneghetti (4 February 1893 – 24 February 1942) was an Italian footballer who played as a midfielder. He competed for Italy in the men's football tournament at the 1920 Summer Olympics.

References

External links
 

1893 births
1942 deaths
Italian footballers
Italy international footballers
Olympic footballers of Italy
Footballers at the 1920 Summer Olympics
People from Novara
Association football midfielders
Novara F.C. players
Juventus F.C. players
Footballers from Piedmont
Sportspeople from the Province of Novara